Luis Agustín García Guido (born 21 June 1941) is a Uruguayan basketball player. He competed in the men's tournament at the 1964 Summer Olympics.

References

External links
 

1941 births
Living people
Uruguayan men's basketball players
1967 FIBA World Championship players
1970 FIBA World Championship players
Olympic basketball players of Uruguay
Basketball players at the 1964 Summer Olympics
Place of birth missing (living people)